Rajalakshmi Institutions is a group of private educational institutes in Chennai, Tamil Nadu, India founded by Mr. S. Meganathan in the year 1997. This group of institutes provide higher education and school level educations to students in and around India.

Rajalakshmi Group Of Institutions

 Rajalakshmi Engineering College, 1997.
 Rajalakshmi School of Management, 1997.
 Rajalakshmi College of Educations, 2006, offering B.Ed. and M.Ed. programmes(Teacher Training), approved and affiliated to Tamil Nadu Teachers Education University.
 Rajalakshmi Institute of Technology, 2008.
 Rajalakshmi College of Nursing, 2008, approved and affiliated to Nursing Council of India and Tamil Nadu Dr. M.G.R. Medical University.
 Rajalakshmi School of Architecture, 2010.
 Rajalakshmi Vidyashram
 Rajalakshmi Automobiles Private Limited ( Dealers of Mahindra Navistar and Mahindra Construction Equipments).
Rajalakshmi Education Private Limited, 2012, offering B.Sc., M.Sc. and MBA programmes.

See also

 Rajalakshmi Engineering College
 Rajalakshmi Institute of Technology
 Rajalakshmi School of Architecture
 Anna University
 Anna University Chennai
 National Board of Accreditation
 National Assessment & Accreditation Council
 All India Council for Technical Education
 Council of Architecture

References

External links 
 Rajalakshmi Institutions Website - Rajalakshmi Institutions Official Website
 Rajalakshmi Engineering College Website - Rajalakshmi Engineering College Official Website
 Rajalakshmi Institute of Technology Website - Rajalakshmi Institute of Technology Official Website

 
Educational organisations based in India